Elachista napaea is a moth in the family Elachistidae. It was described by Philpott in 1930. It is found in New Zealand.

The wingspan is 9–10 mm. Head and thorax grey. The forewings are whitish-grey with a few ochreous and various blackish scales. There is a series of blackish dots along the fold from near the base to about one-third and an ochreous blotch on the fold at about three-fourths, containing a linear black mark. The hindwings are fuscous-grey.

References

Moths described in 1930
napaea
Moths of New Zealand
Endemic fauna of New Zealand
Endemic moths of New Zealand